Joseph Blackburn was an English portrait painter who worked mainly in Bermuda and colonial America.

Artworks

Attributed Artworks
Although questions remain, these artworks have been attributed to Joseph Blackburn.

References

Sources
 Inventories of American Painting (IAP), Smithsonian Institution Research Information System(SIRIS): http://sirismm.si.edu/siris/aboutari.htm
 The Peerage: http://thepeerage.com/index.htm

External links
John Singleton Copley in America, a full text exhibition catalog from The Metropolitan Museum of Art, which contains material on Joseph Blackburn (see index)

Blackburn, Joseph